Eddie Holman (born June 3, 1946) is an American singer, minister, and recording artist, best known for his 1970 hit song "Hey There Lonely Girl". His specialties range from R&B and pop to Gospel.

Early life
Holman was born in Norfolk, Virginia on June 3, 1946 but raised in New York City. His mother, noticing that he loved to sing even as early as the age of 2, introduced him to the piano and the guitar, where he quickly revealed a natural aptitude. His abilities, however, were confined mostly to church and family gatherings. At age 10, Holman stepped onto the stage on Amateur Night at the Apollo Theater and showed his smooth tenor voice. His victory at the Apollo began to open many other doors, and soon he was performing at theaters on Broadway and even at Carnegie Hall. He was a regular performer on NBC's The Children's Hour.

Not wanting her son to miss any opportunity, his mother was able to get him enrolled at the Victoria School of Music in Harlem. At Victoria, he learned the technical craft of music and began to blossom.

As a teenager, Holman moved to Philadelphia with his family. After graduating from high school, he attended Cheyney State University where he graduated with a degree in music.

Career
In 1962, Holman made his first record "What You Don’t Know Won’t Hurt You" on Leopard Records. It was in the Philadelphia soul scene that he began to develop his trademark style. While still in college, he recorded his first hit record, "This Can't Be True" (1966), which reached number 17 on the Billboard chart. Other hits began to follow: "Am I a Loser from the Start" (1966), "I Love You" (1969), "Don't Stop Now" (1970), and "Cathy Called" (1970). Holman finally struck personal gold in 1970 with his ballad, "Hey There Lonely Girl" (originally "Hey There Lonely Boy", a top 30 hit recorded in 1963 by Ruby and the Romantics), which peaked at number 2 on the Billboard Hot 100 chart. The track peaked at number 4 in the UK Singles Chart in November 1974. It sold over one million copies, and was awarded a gold disc from the R.I.A.A. in March 1970.

British journalist Tony Cummings once wrote, "Eddie Holman's voice, an astonishing precision instrument which can leap octaves with the speed of mercury and bend notes into shapes unimagined by lesser singers, has assured its possessor a place in soul history.

In 1977, Holman had a brief resurgence in popularity with his last two hit singles, "This Will Be a Night to Remember" and "You Make My Life Complete".

Holman owns his own record label, Agape Records, and music publishing company, Schoochiebug Music Publishing ASCAP.  He also continues to tour with the Eddie Holman Band. During the summer of 2007, Holman performed weekly for the passengers aboard the  cruise ship while it was en route to the inside passage of Alaska.

Personal life
Holman and his wife Sheila have three children. He is an ordained Baptist minister who uses his musical talents both as a tool of entertainment and his faith. He believes that his talent is a gift from God and therefore must be used to glorify his maker. Furthermore, it is his belief "that those who are blessed with creative talent have a responsibility to encourage personal accountability and to set the best example possible because of the powerful influence that they have on the lives of so many young ones."

He still resides in Philadelphia and spends time as a local community volunteer helping reach out to those less fortunate. He also works within the Philadelphia School System encouraging young people to become involved in the performing arts.

Discography
 I Love You (1969)
 A Night to Remember (1977)
 United (1985)
 Love Story (2007)

Compilations:
 Eddie Holman and The Larks – Sweet Memories (1989)
 Eddie Holman and The Larks – Eddie's My Name (1993)
 This Can't Be True (2000)
 Hey There Lonely Girl (2014)

See also
 List of 1970s one-hit wonders in the United States

References

External links
 

1946 births
American male singers
American soul singers
Living people
Musicians from Norfolk, Virginia
Singers from New York City
Northern soul musicians
20th-century Baptist ministers from the United States
21st-century Baptist ministers from the United States